The London Air Defence Area (LADA) was the name given to the organisation created to defend London from the increasing threat from German airships during World War I. Formed in September 1915, it was commanded initially by Admiral Sir Percy Scott, a controversial figure, responsible for major advances in naval gunnery techniques, but also accused of insubordination and profiting from his inventions.

In August 1917 Major-General Edward Ashmore was appointed Commander of the London Air Defence Area.

Airfields

At the end of the war, the following airfields came under the direct control of LADA:

References
Notes

Bibliography

 Christopher Cole and E.F. Cheeseman, The Air Defence of Britain, 1914-1918, 1984, Hungry Minds Inc,  
 Peter G Cooksley, Aviation Enthusiasts' Guide To London & The South-East, PSL, 1982, 

Royal Flying Corps
United Kingdom in World War I
Aviation in London
Military units and formations in London
Defence of London